Gustavo Bergalli (born December 14, 1940 in Buenos Aires) is an Argentine jazz trumpeter and bandleader.

Discography
Crossworlds (CD, Album), Igloo 	2001
Hot Salsa (LP, Album), Montezuma Records 1976
Solfeggietto (LP, Album), Mariann Grammofon AB 1978
Hård Kärlek (LP) 	Leva Mig Ett Liv Polar Music International AB 1981
Polyglot (LP, Album) Caprice Records 1983
Himlen Runt Hörnet (LP, Album) Ändå Faller Regnet Diesel Music 1992
The Complete Studio Recordings (9xCD, Album + 2xDVD-V + Box) Polar Music International AB 	2005
Quinteplus (CD) Vampi Soul 2007
Sweet Surprise (LP, Album, RE) Celeste 2007 Jazz Unit featuring Maucha Adnet & Gustavo Bergalli'', Pama Records (7331510103213)

References

Argentine jazz trumpeters
Musicians from Buenos Aires
1940 births
Living people
21st-century trumpeters